Warszewo transmitter is a radio broadcasting facility at Warszewo, Szczecin, a suburb of Szczecin, Poland.

The Warszewo transmitter entered service in 1949 as medium wave broadcasting station, active in 1949–1950 on 1302 kilohertz (kHz), between 1950 and 1955 on 1259 kHz and between 1955 and 1978 on 1304 kHz. After the Geneva Frequency Plan went in service on November 22–23, 1978, it broadcast on 1260 kHz with a power of 160 kW and was therefore receivable at night time in all of Europe.

The Warszewo transmitter, which used as its antenna a 113 metres tall guyed mast radiator insulated against ground, stopped medium wave broadcasting on January 2, 1998. The mast was transformed afterwards into a mast for FM transmission, whereby its height increased to 114 metres. The basement insulator was bridged and its guys, divided by insulators,  were replaced by guys without insulators.

Transmitted programmes

See also 
 List of tallest structures in Poland

External links 
 List of transmitted programmes

Radio masts and towers in Poland
Buildings and structures in Szczecin
Towers completed in 1949
1949 establishments in Poland